Martino Gomiero (7 December 1924 – 20 November 2009) was the Catholic bishop of the Diocese of Adria-Rovigo, Italy.

Career 
Ordained on 4 July 1948, Pope John Paul II appointed Gomiero diocesan bishop of Velletri-Segni on 5 June 1982 and he was ordained on 11 July 1982. On 7 May 1988, Bishop Gomiero was appointed bishop of the Adria-Rovigo Diocese retiring on 11 October 2000.

Notes

Bishops of Adria
1924 births
2009 deaths
20th-century Italian Roman Catholic bishops